Mohammad Ghouchani (born 22 September 1976 in Rasht) is an Iranian journalist. He has served as editor-in-chief of various reformist print media, many of which have been banned by the authorities.

Early life and education 
Ghouchani was born in 1976 in the city of Rasht. He graduated from the University of Tehran with a degree in Political Science.

Career 
He started his career in Jame'eh, the most famous among the newspapers that started after the reformer Mohammad Khatami became the president in 1997. Ghouchani also wrote for Asr-e Azadegan and became the "star" of that publication. In 2000, he won political columnist of the year prize at the Iranian Press Festival, but was jailed shortly after for his writings.

He became the first editor-in-chief of Shargh in 2003 until it was closed down in September 2006. He then held the same position at Ham-Mihan between May and June 2007, when the latter was also banned. From 2007 to 2008, he was editor of the weekly magazine Shahrvand-e-Emrooz. Ghouchani then served as the editor-in-chief of Etemad-e Melli, the official organ of National Trust Party led by Mehdi Karroubi. He was also in charge of the women's lifestyle magazine Irandokht, another publication close to Karroubi, until its office was raided in December 2009. In the aftermath of 2009 Iranian presidential election protests, Ghouchani was imprisoned along with many journalists and both his publications were closed down. After 131 days in detention, he was released on bail.

With ease of pressure on media as Hassan Rouhani took office, Ghouchani published a pre-issue of Ham-Mihan on 26 October 2013, but the judicial system allegedly prevented republication of the newspaper. He also served as the editor-in-chief of Aseman and Mehrnameh. The former was a weekly magazine that was turned into a daily newspaper, but it was shut down by the judicial authorities less than a week after its launch in February 2014.

Views 
Ghouchani is a critic of Neo-Shariatism.

In 2004, Ghouchani spoke out about the red lines that could not be crossed in Iran, and said he views the ethical standard for journalism in Iran as "not lying to society". He also stated "Journalism is our job, our passion and our life, something that we don’t want to lose, unless we reach the point where we cannot work honorably".

References

Iranian journalists
People from Rasht
Living people
1976 births
Executives of Construction Party politicians
Iranian newspaper publishers (people)
Amnesty International prisoners of conscience held by Iran